Paolo Bertolucci (born 3 August 1951) is an Italian former professional tennis player. He is currently working as sport commentator for Italian Sky TV.

Bertolucci won the Davis Cup with Italy in 1976. His greatest success on ATP Tour was the victory at the 1977 Hamburg Masters, where he beat Manuel Orantes in the final in four sets. In 1976, Bertolucci also won the Grand Prix tournaments of Florence and Barcelona. His career-high singles ranking was world No. 12, achieved in August 1973.

Bertolucci was non-playing-captain of the Italy Davis Cup team from 1985 to 2001.

He considers himself Roman Catholic.

Career finals

Singles: 12 (6–6)

Doubles: 19 (12–7)

See also
 Tennis in Italy

References

External links
 
 
 

1951 births
Living people
Italian male tennis players
Sportspeople from the Province of Lucca
People from Forte dei Marmi
Italian Roman Catholics